Inodrillia hatterasensis is a species of sea snail, a marine gastropod mollusk in the family Horaiclavidae.

It was previously included within the family Turridae, the turrids.

Description
The length of the shell attains 17 mm.

Distribution
This marine species occurs off North Carolina, USA, at depths between 115 and 260 m.

References

 Bartsch P., A Review of Some West Atlantic Turritid Mollusks. Memorias de la Sociedad Cubana de Historia Natural, 17 (2):81-122, plates 7-15

External links
  Tucker, J.K. 2004 Catalog of recent and fossil turrids (Mollusca: Gastropoda). Zootaxa 682:1–1295.

hatterasensis